Can Zam is a Barcelona Metro station in the municipality of Santa Coloma de Gramenet, in the northern part of the metropolitan area of Barcelona. The station is located at the intersection of Avinguda Francesc Macià and Carrer Balmes. It's served by L9, the first part of line 9 to be opened, between Can Zam and Can Peixauet, both in Santa Coloma. Its inauguration took place on 13 December 2009.

Services

See also
List of Barcelona Metro stations

External links
Can Zam at Trenscat.com

Barcelona Metro line 9 stations
Railway stations in Spain opened in 2009
Transport in Santa Coloma de Gramenet